is  the general manager of the Toyotsu Fighting Eagles Nagoya in the Japanese B.League.

Head coaching record

|-
| style="text-align:left;"|Toyotsu
| style="text-align:left;"|2007-08
| 16||14||2|||| style="text-align:center;"|2nd|||1||0||1||
| style="text-align:center;"|4th place

|-
| style="text-align:left;"|Toyotsu
| style="text-align:left;"|2008-09
| 14||14||0|||| style="text-align:center;"|1st|||2||2||0||
| style="text-align:center;"|JBL2 Champions
|-
| style="text-align:left;"|Toyotsu
| style="text-align:left;"|2009-10
| 21||21||0|||| style="text-align:center;"|1st|||2||2||0||
| style="text-align:center;"|JBL2 Champions
|-
| style="text-align:left;"|Toyotsu
| style="text-align:left;"|2010-11
| 22||22||0|||| style="text-align:center;"|1st|||-||-||-||
| style="text-align:center;"|-
|-
| style="text-align:left;"|Toyotsu
| style="text-align:left;"|2011-12
| 27||24||3|||| style="text-align:center;"|1st|||2||2||0||
| style="text-align:center;"|JBL2 Champions
|-
| style="text-align:left;"|Toyotsu
| style="text-align:left;"|2012-13
| 32||22||10|||| style="text-align:center;"|3rd|||-||-||-||
| style="text-align:center;"|5th
|-
| style="text-align:left;"|Toyotsu
| style="text-align:left;"|2013-14
| 32||30||2|||| style="text-align:center;"|1st|||2||1||1||
| style="text-align:center;"|Runners-up in NBDL
|-
| style="text-align:left;"|Toyotsu
| style="text-align:left;"|2014-15
| 32||30||2|||| style="text-align:center;"|1st|||2||1||1||
| style="text-align:center;"|3rd place
|-
| style="text-align:left;"|Toyotsu
| style="text-align:left;"|2015-16
| 36||32||4|||| style="text-align:center;"|1st|||2||1||1||
| style="text-align:center;"|Runners-up in NBDL
|-
| style="text-align:left;"|FE Nagoya
| style="text-align:left;"|2016-17
| 60||42||18|||| style="text-align:center;"|2nd in B2 Central|||-||-||-||
| style="text-align:center;"|-
|-
| style="text-align:left;"|FE Nagoya
| style="text-align:left;"|2017-18
| 60||39||21|||| style="text-align:center;"|1st in B2 Central|||4||0||4||
| style="text-align:center;"|4th in B2
|-
| style="text-align:left;"|FE Nagoya
| style="text-align:left;"|2018-19
| 60||41||19|||| style="text-align:center;"|2nd in B2 Central|||-||-||-||
| style="text-align:center;"|5th in B2

References

1971 births
Living people

Japanese basketball coaches
Toyotsu Fighting Eagles Nagoya coaches